Altura is a 1949 Italian crime melodrama film directed by Mario Sequi and starring Massimo Girotti, Roldano Lupi and Eleonora Rossi Drago. It is set in Sardinia and portrays a struggle between large landowners and a co-operative of shepherds.

Cast
 Massimo Girotti as Stanis Archena 
 Roldano Lupi as Efisio Barra 
 Eleonora Rossi Drago as Grazia 
 Anna Maria Bottini as Zia Alena 
 Fausto Guerzoni as Napoleone 
 Vittorio Duse
 Mirko Ellis
 Gianni De Montero
 Paolo Scampuddu
Nanni Peru

References

Bibliography 
 Maria Bonaria Urban. Sardinia on Screen: The Construction of the Sardinian Character in Italian Cinema. Rodopi, 2013.

External links 
 

1949 films
Italian drama films
1949 drama films
1940s Italian-language films
Films directed by Mario Sequi
Films set in Sardinia
Italian black-and-white films
Melodrama films
1940s Italian films